Aeroflot Flight 213  was a regularly scheduled passenger flight operated by Aeroflot from Chersky Airport to Keperveyem Airport. On 18 September 1962, the Ilyushin Il-14 operating this flight crashed shortly after takeoff. All 27 passengers and five crew members were killed. 

The Air Accident Investigation Commission determined that pilot error was the main cause of the accident.

Accident
Weather conditions at the time of the flight were poor. Visibility was 4-10km in light snow with a cloud base of 600-700 meters.  
Flight 213 departed Chersky Airport at 06:20. The normal procedure involved circling above the valley while climbing to an altitude above surrounding terrain. This procedure was not followed and the crew flew on a heading directly to Keperveyem Airport. At an altitude of 800 meters and climbing, flying in clouds the aircraft impacted a 975 meter tall mountain. The Ilyushin was destroyed and there was a post collision fire. There were no survivors.

Aircraft
Construction of the Il-14M involved, serial number 146000929 09-29, was completed at the Moscow Banner of Labor production factory in 1956
and it was transferred to the civil air fleet. It was powered by two Shvetsov ASh-82 radial engines and at the time of the accident, the aircraft had sustained a total of 9,858 flight hours.

Investigation

The investigating committee discovered the primary cause of the accident was the pilots decision to deviate from approved procedures. Contributing factors were a lack of appropriate air traffic control and the weather.

See also
Aeroflot accidents and incidents
Aeroflot accidents and incidents in the 1960s

References

Aviation accidents and incidents in 1962
Accidents and incidents involving the Ilyushin Il-14
Aviation accidents and incidents in the Soviet Union
1962 in the Soviet Union
213